Tyson Smoothy (born 7 July 1999) is an Australian professional rugby league footballer who plays as a  for the Brisbane Broncos in the National Rugby League.

He has previously played for the Melbourne Storm in the NRL.

Background
Smoothy was born in Toowoomba, Queensland and raised on the Sunshine Coast. He was educated at Mountain Creek State High School and played his junior rugby league for the Kawana Dolphins before being signed by the Brisbane Broncos.

Playing career
In 2015, Smoothy represented Queensland under-16 in their win over New South Wales. In 2017, Smoothy played for the Brisbane Broncos under-20s side and captained Queensland under-18.

In 2018, Smoothy joined the Sunshine Coast Falcons in the Queensland Cup, playing for their under-20 side. In 2019, he was named Man of the Match in their under-20 Grand Final win over the Wynnum Manly Seagulls. In 2020, Smoothy joined the Penrith Panthers, playing for them in the NRL Nines and the New South Wales Cup.

2021
In 2021, Smoothy joined Melbourne on a train-and-trial deal. 

In Round 1 of the 2021 NRL season, he made his NRL debut for the Melbourne club in their 26–18 win against South Sydney.
On 6 October, Smoothy was released by the Melbourne club having played only four games in the 2021 NRL season.

2022
Smoothy rejoined Sunshine Coast Falcons on full-time basis before being temporarily recalled by Melbourne Storm in Round 3 of the 2022 NRL season when their four first choice hookers were unavailable. Smoothy was named as a reserve, but was not required.

At the end of the 2022 Queensland Cup season, Smoothy was named as hooker in the competition's team of the season.

References

External links
Melbourne Storm profile (archived) 
QRL profile

1999 births
Living people
Australian rugby league players
Sunshine Coast Falcons players
Rugby league hookers
Rugby league players from Toowoomba
Melbourne Storm players